Carrusel Deportivo is a Spanish sports program broadcast on Cadena SER. It could be compared with 5 live Sport in the United Kingdom.

The program is transmitted on weekends from 3 pm to 1:30 am, and on Sundays only from 12 pm to 2:30 pm. It covers football games of the Spanish La Liga premier division and analyses the day's sports news with journalists, sports commentators and sportspeople. The program also broadcasts on selected Tuesdays and Wednesdays from 8.30 pm to 11.30 pm to cover UEFA Champions League games, the UEFA Cup, and Spain national football team matches.

References

External links
 Carrusel Deportivo official site

Spanish radio programs
Cadena SER